Stephen Owusu Banahene (born 18 December 1994) is a Ghanaian professional footballer who plays as a midfielder for Ghanaian Premier League side Ashanti Gold.

Career 
Banahene made 3 league appearances in the 2019–20 Ghana Premier League season before it was put on hold and later cancelled due to the COVID-19 pandemic. In August 2020, there were reports in the media that four players including Banahene had had their contracts terminated. The three other players were striker Benedict Wobenu, defender Atta Kusi and Midfielder Isaac Quansah. However he was named on the team's squad list for the 2020–21 Ghana Premier League.

References

External links 

 
 

Living people
1994 births
Association football midfielders
Ghanaian footballers
Ghana Premier League players
Ashanti Gold SC players